John Davison (born 14 February 1966 in London) is a British sport shooter. He competed at the 2000 Summer Olympics in the men's skeet event, in which he tied for 19th place.  He graduated from University of Cambridge and Harvard Business School.

References

1966 births
Living people
Skeet shooters
British male sport shooters
Shooters at the 2000 Summer Olympics
Olympic shooters of Great Britain
Alumni of the University of Cambridge
Harvard Business School alumni